This is a list of monuments that are classified by the Moroccan ministry of culture around Tangier.

Monuments and sites in Tangier 

|}

References 

Tangier
Tangier